The Gilera GFR 250 (which stands for Gilera Formula Racing) is a racing motorcycle designed, developed and built by Gilera which made its debut in the 250cc class of the world championship in 1992.

See also 
Aprilia RS250
Honda NSR250
Honda RS250R
KTM 250 FRR
Suzuki RGV250
Kawasaki KR250
Yamaha YZR 250

References

GFR 250
Grand Prix motorcycles
Motorcycles introduced in 1992